Adamowice  is a village in the administrative district of Gmina Kutno, within Kutno County, Łódź Voivodeship, in central Poland.

The village has a population of 210.

References

Villages in Kutno County